Skjeggedal is a remote village area in Åmli municipality in Agder county, Norway.  The village is located in the Skjeggedalen valley, west of the Tovdal valley in western Åmli.  The area is only accessible by a rural road leading northwest from the village of Mykland (in neighboring Froland municipality).

References

Villages in Agder
Åmli